The United States has maintained many high level contacts with Turkey since the 19th century.

Ottoman Empire

Chargé d'Affaires
George W. Erving (before 1831)
David Porter (September 13, 1831 – May 23, 1840)

Minister Resident
David Porter (May 23, 1840 – March 3, 1843)
Dabney Smith Carr (February 29, 1844 – October 20, 1849)
George Perkins Marsh (March 11, 1850 – December 19, 1853)
Carroll Spence (February 9, 1854 – December 12, 1857)
James Williams (May 27, 1858 – May 25, 1861)
Edward Joy Morris (October 22, 1861 – October 25, 1870)
Wayne MacVeagh (October 25, 1870 – June 10, 1871)
George H. Boker (March 25, 1872 – May 1, 1875)
Horace Maynard (June 12, 1875 – July 15, 1880)
James Longstreet (December 14, 1880 – April 29, 1881)
Lewis Wallace (September 6, 1881 – September 4, 1882)

Envoy Extraordinary and Minister Plenipotentiary
Lewis Wallace (September 4, 1882 – May 15, 1885)
Samuel S. Cox (August 25, 1885 – September 14, 1886)
Oscar S. Straus (July 1, 1887 – June 16, 1889)
Solomon Hirsch (December 28, 1889 – June 16, 1892) 
David P. Thompson (January 11, 1893 – May 1, 1893)
Alexander W. Terrell (July 7, 1893 – June 15, 1897)
James Burrill Angell (September 3, 1897 – August 13, 1898)
Oscar S. Straus (October 15, 1898 – December 20, 1899)
John G. A. Leishman (March 29, 1901 – October 5, 1906)

Ambassador Extraordinary and Plenipotentiary
John G. A. Leishman (October 5, 1906 – June 10, 1909)
Oscar S. Straus (October 4, 1909 – September 3, 1910)
William Woodville Rockhill (August 28, 1911 – November 20, 1913)
Henry Morgenthau, Sr. (December 11, 1913 – February 1, 1916)
Abram I. Elkus (October 2, 1916 – April 20, 1917)

The Ottoman Empire severed diplomatic relations with the United States on April 20, 1917, after the United States declared war against Germany on April 4, 1917. Normal diplomatic relations were re-established with the Empire's successor state, Turkey, in 1927.

Republic of Turkey

Joseph Grew (October 12, 1927 – March 13, 1932)
Charles Hitchcock Sherrill (May 20, 1932 – March 23, 1933)
Robert Peet Skinner (October 16, 1933 – January 16, 1936)
John Van Antwerp MacMurray (March 16, 1936 – November 28, 1941)
Laurence A. Steinhardt (March 10, 1942 – April 2, 1945)
Edwin C. Wilson (June 11, 1945 – August 20, 1948)
George Wadsworth (October 1, 1948 – January 2, 1952)
George C. McGhee (January 15, 1952 – June 19, 1953)
Avra M. Warren (September 17, 1953 – February 17, 1956)
Fletcher Warren (June 13, 1956 – November 15, 1960)
Raymond A. Hare (April 5, 1961 – August 27, 1965)
Parker T. Hart (October 11, 1965 – October 3, 1968)
Robert Komer (December 3, 1968 – May 7, 1969)
William J. Handley (July 1, 1969 – April 19, 1973)
William B. Macomber, Jr. (May 16, 1973 – June 15, 1977)
Ronald I. Spiers (July 12, 1977 – January 11, 1980)
James W. Spain (February 26, 1980 – August 16, 1981)
Robert Strausz-Hupé (September 7, 1981 – May 18, 1989)
Morton I. Abramowitz (August 1, 1989 – July 25, 1991)
Richard Clark Barkley (November 8, 1991 – December 15, 1994)
Marc Grossman (January 3, 1995 – June 1, 1997)
Mark Robert Parris (November 12, 1997 – September 8, 2000)
W. Robert Pearson (September 21, 2000 – July 23, 2003)
Eric S. Edelman (August 29, 2003 – June 19, 2005)
Ross Wilson (December 8, 2005 – August 9, 2008)
James Franklin Jeffrey (December 3, 2008 – July 31, 2010)
Francis J. Ricciardone (January 28, 2011 – July 8, 2014)
Jess L. Baily (July 9, 2014 – September 8, 2014)
John R. Bass (October 20, 2014 – October 15, 2017)
David M. Satterfield (August 28, 2019 – January 7, 2022)
Jeff Flake (January 26, 2022 – present)

Gallery

See also
 Turkey–United States relations
 Ambassadors of the United States
 Embassy of Turkey, Washington D.C.
 Ambassadors of Turkey to the United States

References

United States Department of State: Background notes on Turkey

External links
 United States Department of State: Chiefs of Mission for Turkey
 United States Department of State: Turkey
 United States Embassy in Ankara
 President Benjamin Harrison Appointments: Solomon Hirsch Minister to Turkey Shapell Manuscript Foundation

 
Turkey
United States
1831 establishments in the Ottoman Empire